Payneham South is a suburb of Adelaide in the City of Norwood Payneham St Peters. It has traditionally been market gardens but is currently undergoing a building boom in which many smaller houses are being built.

Payneham South Post Office closed in 1982.

Payneham Cemetery is located on Marian Road.

References

Suburbs of Adelaide